Tryfon Triantafyllakos (born 1891) was a Greek épée and sabre fencer. He competed at four Olympic Games.

References

External links
 

1891 births
Year of death missing
Greek male épée fencers
Olympic fencers of Greece
Fencers at the 1912 Summer Olympics
Fencers at the 1924 Summer Olympics
Fencers at the 1928 Summer Olympics
Fencers at the 1936 Summer Olympics
Sportspeople from Athens
Greek male sabre fencers